Ben Mitchell (born 6 April 1994) is an English-born Irish professional rugby union player who is currently a lock. , he is with the United States team Seattle Seawolves in Major League Rugby (MLR). He previously played for Youghal RFC, University College Cork in Ireland, the Gentlemen of Aspen RFC of Colorado, Austin Elite and San Diego Legion.

Career
Mitchell was educated at the independent Midleton College and then at University College Cork (UCC), both of which have produced leading rugby players. At UCC, he studied Commerce and joined  University College Cork RFC. In his first year and a half, he played in the university club's under-20 team, then in 2014 joined the senior team in the All Ireland League, remaining on the team until halfway through the 2017/18 season. In 2015/2016, UCC RFC was promoted to Division 1 of the League. In 2016 and 2017, Mitchell was selected for the Irish Universities to play the English Universities. He was UCC RFC player of the year for the 2016/17 season and played his last game for the team in November 2017. At the end of the 2016 AIL season Mitchell was selected on the bench for a Munster Rugby A/Development side against the Irish under 20s team 

In 2016 and 2017, Mitchell was a summer player for the Gentlemen of Aspen in the Rocky Mountain Summer League, starring in the Ruggerfest tournament in 2017. In October 2017 he signed a two-year contract with Austin Elite to join the team for the inaugural Major League Rugby season of 2018 and was re-signed in January 2019.

In 2018 and 2019 Mitchell played as lock for Austin in every game but one. In 2019 he became team captain, taking over from Andrew Suniula.  In 2018 Mitchell was named on the All-MLR 1st team and was regarded as the best lock in the competition. 
In 2019 he again achieved All-MLR honors by being named on the All-MLR 2nd team.
In August 2019 he was signed by San Diego Legion, in what was seen as a major blow for the Austin franchise. In late 2020 he will qualify for the United States national rugby union team by residency in the US and is predicted to be of interest to the selectors.

In 2019 he was named as the Head Coach of the Gentlemen of Aspen. He helped the Gentlemen of Aspen to the 2021 Ruggerfest title as player/coach.

He was resigned by San Diego Legion for 2020–21.

In October 2021 Mitchell was selected for the United States national rugby union team Selects team to play in the Americas Pacific Challenge in Uruguay. Mitchell played in both games in Uruguay against Chile A and Brazil A and was singled out by head coach Mike Tolkin as one of the USA’s standout performers on the tour.

Mitchell became the 14th player in  Major League Rugby history to play 50 times in the competition.

Mitchell was named in the All-MLR 1st team for the 2022 season.
This was Mitchell’s 3rd All-MLR selection in 5 seasons, having been named on the 1st Team in 2018 and 2nd Team in 2019.

In the 2022 MLR offseason it was announced that Mitchell had signed a multi year contract with the Seattle Seawolves franchise ahead of the 2023 MLR Season.

Notes

External links
Ben Mitchell at americasrugbynews.com
Ben Mitchell at ultimaterugby.com
Ben Mitchell at itsrugby.co.uk
Ben Mitchell at majorleague.rugby

1994 births
Living people
Alumni of University College Cork
Austin Gilgronis players
Irish expatriate rugby union players
Irish expatriate sportspeople in the United States
Expatriate rugby union players in the United States
People educated at Midleton College
Rugby union players from Nottingham
Rugby union locks
English rugby union players
Irish rugby union players
American rugby union players
San Diego Legion players
Seattle Seawolves players